Georgy Vasilovich Shchokin (ukr.: Гео́ргій Васи́льович Що́кін) (born May 27, 1954, in Zaporizhzhya is a Ukrainian (of Russian ethnicity) businessman, sociologist, psychologist and a politician. He is also the founder and owner of MAUP (a private college known for its close ties with David Duke and other Holocaust deniers).

Biography
Schokin graduated in 1981 from the Kyiv Pedagogical Institute.

He is the founder and owner of the Interregional Academy of Personnel Management.

Shchokin heads the Ukrainian "Miloserdiye" Foundation. He is a part owner and vice-president of the two vanity presses — International Biographical Centre (UK) and American Biographical Institute that have been described as scam operations.

References

External links
 Хто є хто в Україні 1997: Біографічний словник. — К., 1997. — С. 302—303.
 Межрегиональная академия управления персоналом
 American Biographical Institute

1954 births
Living people
Ukrainian publishers (people)
Holocaust deniers
Businesspeople from Zaporizhzhia
Ukrainian people of Russian descent
Antisemitism in Ukraine
National Pedagogical Dragomanov University alumni
Recipients of the Honorary Diploma of the Cabinet of Ministers of Ukraine